Menoken is an unincorporated community and a census-designated place (CDP) in southwestern Burleigh County, North Dakota, United States.  It was designated as part of the U.S. Census Bureau's Participant Statistical Areas Program on June 10, 2010. It was not counted separately during the 2000 Census, but was included in the 2010 Census, where a population of 70 was reported.

It lies southeast of the city of Bismarck, the county seat of Burleigh County.  Its elevation is 1,722 feet (525 m).  The community has had many different names, starting with Seventeenth Siding in 1873, then it was soon renamed Blaine for James G. Blaine, U.S. Senator from Maine, then when the post office opened in 1880, the town was renamed Clarke's Farm after C.J. Clarke of Pittsburgh, a local farmer. The town was finally renamed Menoken in 1883, which is an Indian name, but the Northern Pacific Railroad disliked the new name and changed the name of their station in 1891 to Burleigh ( Burleigh Station), and the siding still carries this alternate name to this day. It has a post office with the ZIP code 58558.

Demographics

Climate
This climatic region is typified by large seasonal temperature differences, with warm to hot (and often humid) summers and cold (sometimes severely cold) winters.  According to the Köppen Climate Classification system, Menoken has a humid continental climate, abbreviated "Dfb" on climate maps.

References

External links
Menoken sign on County Rt 10

Census-designated places in Burleigh County, North Dakota
Census-designated places in North Dakota
Unincorporated communities in North Dakota